Jhon is a spelling variant of the English given name John. Its usage is popular in South America, especially in Colombia, where it is one of the most common names in the country.

Origin
Jhon originates from Hebrew Yohanan (יוֹחָנָן‎), "Graced by Yah", or Yehohanan (יְהוֹחָנָן‎), "Yahweh is Gracious".

Notable people with the name Jhon

Athletes

Footballers
 Jhon Castillo (born 1983), Colombian forward
 Jhon Charría (born 1978), Colombian midfielder
 Jhon Cley Jesus Silva (born 1994), Brazilian midfielder 
 Jhon Córdoba (born 1993), Colombian striker, who plays for German club FC Köln
 Jhon Culma (born 1981), Colombian
 Jhon Epam (born 1983), Equatoguinean striker
 Jhon Kennedy Hurtado (born 1984), Colombian who last played for American team Chivas
 Jhon Jairo Mosquera (born 1988), Colombian forward
 Jhon Mosquera (born 1990), professional Colombian
 Jhon Obregón (born 1990), Colombian striker
 Jhon Pírez (born 1993), Uruguayan footballer
 Jhon Valencia (born 1982), Colombian midfielder
 Jhon Viáfara (born 1978), Colombian midfielder
 Jhon van Beukering (born 1983), Dutch-born Indonesian naturalised, retired
 Jhon Lucumí (born 1997), Colombian footballer
 Jhon Murillo (born 1995), Venezuelan footballer
 Jhon Wilson Murillo (born 1990), Colombian footballer

Cyclists
 Jhon Darwin Atapuma Hurtado (born 1988), Colombian cyclist
 Jhon García (born 1974), male professional track and road racing cyclist from Colombia
 Jhon González (born 1971), Colombian former cyclist
 Jhon Jarrín (1961–2021), Ecuadorian former cyclist
 Jhon Quiceno (born 1954), Colombian former cyclist
 Jhon Anderson Rodríguez (born 1996), Colombian cyclist

Other sports
 Jhon Édison Rodríguez (born 1991), Colombian fencer
 Jhon Romero (born 1995), Colombian baseball pitcher
 Jhon Solís (born 1993), Colombian sprinter

See also
 Alternate forms for the name John

References

Given names
Masculine given names
Spanish masculine given names